Lee Matthew Baddeley (born 12 July 1974) is a Welsh former professional footballer. He made over 150 appearances in the Football League for Cardiff City and Exeter City.

Career

Baddeley began his career at his hometown club Cardiff City as a YTS trainee, making his debut on 24 November 1990 away to Gillingham, breaking the record of John Toshack, as the youngest to play for Cardiff City. He eventually managed to establish himself in the side during the 1993–94 season and scored his only goal for the Bluebirds against Brighton in November 1994. After again falling down the pecking order at Ninian Park he decided to leave the club and moved to Exeter City in February 1997. However his time at the club was blighted by a persistent hamstring injury which meant he struggled to retain fitness. He was eventually forced to retire from injury in 1999 and, despite an attempted comeback in 2000, he eventually finished his career after a spell at Merthyr Tydfil.

After football

Following his retirement, Baddeley took a job as a trainee greenkeeper at a golf course in Exeter and obtained a Foundation Degree in Sports Turf Science and Management.

References

1974 births
Living people
Footballers from Cardiff
Welsh footballers
Cardiff City F.C. players
Exeter City F.C. players
Merthyr Tydfil F.C. players
Wales under-21 international footballers
English Football League players
Association football defenders